The 1996–97 season of the División de Honor de Futsal is the 8th season of top-tier futsal in Spain.

Regular season

League table

Playoffs

See also
División de Honor de Futsal
Futsal in Spain

External links
1996–97 season at lnfs.es

1996 97
Spain
futsal